Youssou is a Senegalese given name. Notable people with the name include:

 Youssou Lo (born 1992), Senegalese footballer
 Youssou N'Dour (born 1959), Senegalese singer, percussionist, songwriter, composer, and actor
 Youssou Ndoye (born 1991), Senegalese basketball player

African masculine given names